Thomas Shipley (born Durham) was an English professional footballer who played for Portsmouth and Gillingham between 1930 and 1933. He played in both full-back positions.

References

Sportspeople from Durham, England
Footballers from County Durham
Association football fullbacks
Year of birth missing
Year of death missing
English footballers
Gillingham F.C. players
Portsmouth F.C. players